"Tanzania Nakupenda Kwa Moyo Wote" is a Swahili-language patriotic song about Tanzania in East Africa. The song's history and authorship is uncertain, but stretches back to the colonial days, when then it was sung as thus "." 

It cannot be ruled out that it was part of an attempt to develop a national anthem towards the end of colonial rule before the South African lyrics version that was introduced and popularized by South African freedom fighters became adopted as anthem. The composition effort could have been coordinated by colonial officials in the last days of British colonialism in Tanganyika. It was changed to Tanzania, Tanzania after the formation of the Tanzanian union in 1964. In Tanzania it is frequently sung alongside the national anthem "Mungu Ibariki Afrika".

The song appears in the 2004 documentary Darwin's Nightmare in which a female sex worker sings the song to seemingly uninterested Russian pilots. Her name was Eliza and she was killed a few days after by an Australian client.

The song was performed in Australia for the fourth President of Tanzania, Jakaya Mrisho Kikwete, when
he was awarded an Honorary Doctor of Philosophy from the University of
Newcastle.

Lyrics

References 

Tanzanian songs
Patriotic songs
Songwriter unknown
Year of song unknown

2. Bernadette Matthias singing 20 July 2015